IRTF may refer to:

 Internet Research Task Force, a research organization working on topics related to the evolution of the Internet
 NASA Infrared Telescope Facility, an infrared telescope in Hawaii
 Intensive Residential Treatment Facility, a facility for youth who require an intensive, out-of-home treatment intervention